Anthony Little  may refer to:

Anthony Little (boxer) (born 1980), Australian amateur lightweight boxer
Tony Little (headmaster), British teacher; headmaster of Eton College
Anthony Little (psychologist), American psychologist
Anthony Little (rugby), Scottish rugby union and rugby league player